The testicular receptor proteins are members of the nuclear receptor family of intracellular transcription factors.  There are two forms of the receptor, TR2 and TR4, each encode by a separate gene ( and  respectively).

References

External links
 
 

Intracellular receptors
Transcription factors